Mariam Bolkvadze (born 1 January 1998) is a tennis player from Georgia.

On 7 March 2022, she achieved a career-high singles ranking of world No. 151, and on 21 March 2022, she peaked at No. 204 in the WTA doubles rankings.

Playing for Georgia Fed Cup team, Bolkvadze has a win–loss record of 7–11 in Fed Cup competitions.

Personal life
Bolkvadze was born in Batumi and at the age of 13 moved to the United Kingdom to further her tennis development. She stayed initially with her godmother before finding a host family two years later. Maria Sharapova was her favourite player growing up. She is fluent in Georgian, Russian, and English.

Junior career
Bolkvadze began playing tennis at the age of 9 and spent much of her teenage years training in London, where she was coached by Otto Buchholdt. As a junior she played in very few ITF events, instead concentrating on domestic competitions organised by the LTA and continental tournaments run by Tennis Europe. She won the 2013 Aegon Junior International in London, defeating Jodie Burrage in the final. At the European Junior Championships held in Moscow later that year she lost to Fanny Stollar in the round of 64. 

She reached her only final on the ITF Junior World Tour as a qualifier at the G4 Nottingham event in April 2013, where she was runner-up to Freya Christie.

She was a finalist with American partner Caty McNally in the girls' doubles at the 2016 Wimbledon Championships, losing to Usue Maitane Arconada and Claire Liu in straight sets. She played her only junior grand slam draw in singles at the same tournament, coming through qualifying before being defeated by Sofia Kenin in the third round.

Senior career

2019: Breakthrough at the US Open
Ranked 202 in the world, Bolkvadze entered US Open qualifying and was drawn against eighth seed Heather Watson. After beating her in straight sets, she defeated in the second round Han Na-lae in three tight sets to set up a match against Xu Shilin. By another win she qualified for her first major main draw, and became the fourth Georgian to qualify for a Grand Slam tournament. In the first round, she defeated Bernarda Pera in three sets, before losing to third seed Karolína Plíšková, 1–6, 4–6. With her wins, she reached a new career-high of 152 in the world.

Grand Slam performance timelines

Singles

ITF Circuit finals

Singles: 14 (6 titles, 8 runner–ups)

Doubles: 19 (11 titles, 8 runner–ups)

Junior Grand Slam finals

Girls' doubles: 1 (title)

National representation

Fed Cup/Billie Jean King Cup
Bolkvadze made her Fed Cup debut for Georgia in 2015, while the team was competing in the Europe/Africa Zone Group I, when she was 17 years and 37 days old.

Singles (4–5)

Doubles (2–0)

Notes

References

External links
 
 
 

1998 births
Living people
Female tennis players from Georgia (country)
Georgian emigrants to England
People from Batumi
Tennis people from Greater London